Stallode Wash, Lakenheath is a  biological Site of Special Scientific Interest north-west of Lakenheath in Suffolk.

This is grassland, fen and reedswamp, which is seasonally flooded by the River Little Ouse, and there are smaller areas of permanent open water. There are two nationally rare plants, water germander and marsh pea.

References

Sites of Special Scientific Interest in Suffolk
Lakenheath